53 King Street is an Edwardian Baroque bank on King Street in Manchester, England. Designed by architect Charles Heathcote, it opened in 1913 and was granted Grade II listed building status in 1974. It used to house a branch of Lloyds TSB. In 2009, the building was sold for £6 million. The building stands on the site of the old Manchester Town Hall.

Architecture
The bank, designed in an elaborate Baroque style, is built on an L-shaped site with seven bays on King Street and eight bays facing Cross Street and between them a chamfered corner. It is constructed of Portland stone on a granite plinth and has a basement with four storeys above and double attics.

References

Grade II listed buildings in Manchester
Edwardian architecture
Baroque Revival architecture
Commercial buildings completed in 1915
Historic bank buildings
Grade II listed banks
Office buildings in Manchester
Stone buildings